Hansen Motorsport (officially Kenneth Hansen Motorsport AB), which competed under the title Team Peugeot-Hansen as Peugeot's official partner in the motorsport of rallycross, is an auto racing team founded by Swedish racing driver Kenneth Hansen in 1990. The team has been competing in rallycross since its creation. Hansen Motorsport used Citroën cars exclusively from 1993 and switched to Peugeot in 2014. Hansen Motorsport ran Peugeot's entry in the World Rallycross Championship from 2014 to 2017.

In December 2017 it was announced that Peugeot Sport would take over the running of Peugeot's factory cars from Hansen Motorsport, through Team Peugeot Total. Kenneth Hansen will stay on as sporting director with Team Peugeot Total.

Racing record

Complete FIA European Rallycross Championship results
(key)

Division 1

Division 2

Division 1*

* ''Division 2 was rebranded as Division 1 in 1997.

Supercar

Super 1600

JRX Junior Rallycross Cup

Complete FIA World Rallycross Championship results
(key)

Supercar

† Ten championship points deducted for use of an unregistered tyre in Q3.
‡ Fifteen championship points deducted for use of a fourth engine in the championship.

RX Lites Cup

Complete Global RallyCross Championship results
(key)

Supercar

GRC Lites

References

External links

 

Swedish auto racing teams
World Rallycross Championship teams
Red Bull sports teams
Global RallyCross Championship teams
Auto racing teams established in 1990